UK Maritime Component Command (UKMCC) is a Royal Navy Command located at HMS Jufair in Bahrain.

Commander, United Kingdom Maritime Component Command
Post holders included:
 Commodore Paul H. Robinson: September 2003 – 2005 
 Commodore Simon T. Williams: 2005-October 2006 
 Commodore Keith Winstanley: October 2006-October 2008 
 Commodore Timothy M. Lowe: October 2008-May 2010 
 Commodore Timothy P. Fraser: May 2010-November 2011 
 Commodore Simon J. Ancona: November 2011-September 2013
 Commodore Keith E. Blount: September 2013-March 2015  
 Commodore William J. Warrender: March 2015-June 2017 
 Commodore Steven Dainton: June 2017 – 2019
 Commodore  Dean A. Bassett: 2019–February 2021
 Commodore Edward G. Ahlgren: February 2021–April 2022

See also
Senior Naval Officer, Persian Gulf

References

Commands of the Royal Navy